Yevgeni Vladimirovich Khlebodarov (born 10 February 1980) is a former Russian football midfielder.

Club career
He played in the Russian Football National League for PFC Spartak Nalchik in 2002.

References

1980 births
People from Balakovo
Living people
Russian footballers
Association football midfielders
PFC Spartak Nalchik players
FC Orenburg players
FC Volga Ulyanovsk players
Sportspeople from Saratov Oblast